The "March of the Macedonian Revolutionaries" also known as "Rise, Dawn of Freedom"; is a Bulgarian march which was used by the Internal Macedonian Revolutionary Organization (IMRO) and the Macedonian Patriotic Organization (MPO). Today, the march is still used by the MPO, as well as by VMRO-BND and the Radko Association.

History 
The lyrics and music of the march were written by Aleksandar Morfov, a Bulgarian military composer in 1923 at a contest by the IMRO. The proposed march was presented to the leader of IMRO, Todor Alexandrov by the composer at the home of General Kosta Nikolov in Sofia. In the period before World War II, the march was performed as the official anthem of the IMRO. The poet Kočo Racin tried to adapt the chorus of the song to the still non-standardized Macedonian language shortly before his death in 1943.

The first Anti-fascist Assembly for the National Liberation of Macedonia meeting, held on August 2 1944 at the Prohor Pčinjski Monastery was opened with the singing the song. In 1948 it was banned by the Yugoslav communist authorities as fascist song promoting Bulgarophile sentiments. Today, there is reserved attitude towards this song in North Macedonia. On August 2 2017, during a service commemorating the Ilinden Uprising, the monks from the Saint Jovan Bigorski Monastery in North Macedonia performed the song, expressing their approval of the friendship treaty signed with Bulgaria the day before.

See also
Denes nad Makedonija

References

External links
 "Rise up Dawn of the Freedom" on  YouTube.
, performed by the monks of Saint Jovan Bigorski Monastery on 2 August 2017 during a service in memory of the Ilinden Uprising.
 The text of the song in Bulgarian Cyrillic with transliteration in Latin script.

Internal Macedonian Revolutionary Organization
Macedonian songs
Bulgarian songs
Yugoslav Macedonia in World War II